Villar del Pozo is a municipality of Spain located in the province of Ciudad Real, Castilla–La Mancha. The municipality spans across a total area of 13.14 km2 and, as of 1 January 2020, it has a registered population of 61.

References 

Municipalities in the Province of Ciudad Real
It is located near the closed Ciudad Real Central Airport.